Thạnh Ngãi is a rural commune of Mỏ Cày Bắc District, Bến Tre Province, Vietnam. The commune covers 11.39 km2. In 1999 it had a population of 8,887 and a population density of 780 inhabitants/km2.

References

 

Communes of Bến Tre province
Populated places in Bến Tre province